Celso Gerardo Guerrero Pereira (born 17 April 1972 in Asunción, Paraguay) is a former association goalkeeper and current manager of Club Fulgencio Yegros of the Paraguayan Primera División C.

Playing career

Club
Guerrero arrived at Universitario in 1995, recommended to the club by José Luís Chilavert. He debuted for Universitario in the 11th round of the 1995 season on 12 May, in a 3–0 victory against León de Huánuco. In the following fixture, he conceded 6 goals in a derby which ended 6–3.

He signed with Tembetary in 2000.

National team
Guerrero participated at the 1993 Copa América in Ecuador, and also participated in the qualifiers for the 1994 FIFA World Cup.

Coaching career
In 2006, Guerrero coached Presidente Hayes and got the club promoted to the División Intermedia, Paraguay's second division.

From 2012 to 2013, he coached Sportivo Ameliano in Paraguay's 4th division.

In 2014, he is managing Fulgencio Yegros in Paraguay's 4th division.

References

External links
 
 

Living people
Paraguayan footballers
Club Libertad footballers
Expatriate footballers in Argentina
Expatriate footballers in Peru
Paraguay international footballers
1993 Copa América players
1972 births
Paraguayan football managers
Association football goalkeepers
Sportivo Ameliano managers